The Pacific Coast Middleweight Championship was a professional wrestling championship that was contended for in the Pacific Northwest from the 1920s to the late 1930s.

Title history
Key

Footnotes

References

Pacific Northwest Wrestling championships
National Wrestling Alliance championships
Middleweight wrestling championships